Watsons Crossing is a rural locality in the Goondiwindi Region, Queensland, Australia. It is on the Queensland border with New South Wales.

History 
The locality was named and bounded on 17 December 1999.

References 

Goondiwindi Region
Localities in Queensland